Lake Rakshastal  (Sanskrit:      राक्षसताल) is a saltwater lake in Tibet Autonomous Region, China, lying just west of Lake Manasarovar and south of Mount Kailash. The Sutlej River (also known by the Tibetan name Langqen Zangbo in this area) originates at Rakshastal's northwestern tip.

Etymology
The name of the lake literally means "lake of the demon" in Sanskrit. It is also known as Ravan Tal, as it is considered to be the place of severe penance by Ravan, the demon-like King of Lanka.

In Buddhism, Lake Manasarovar, which is round like the sun, and Rakshastal, shaped as a crescent, are respectively regarded as "brightness" and "darkness". Rakshastal is a saline lake. There is a short river named Ganga Chhu, which connects Lake Manasarovar with Rakshastal, believed to be created by rishis to add pure water from Manasarovar.

There are four islands in Rakshastal, named Topserma (Dose), Dola (the two biggest), Lachato (Nadzhado), and Dosharba. The islands are used by local people as winter pastures for their yaks.

In the Tibetan language, the lake is known as Lagngar Cho or Lhanag Tso, which means "the dark lake of poison".

Religious significance
According to Hindu scriptures, Rakshastal was created by Ravana for the express purpose of garnering superpowers through acts of devotion and meditation to the god, Shiva, who resided on Mount Kailash. It was upon the banks of a special island in this lake that he would make a daily offering with one of his ten heads as a sacrifice to please Shiva. Finally, on the tenth day, Shiva was moved enough by his devotion to grant Ravana his wish to obtain superpowers.

As there are no plants or wildlife around the lake, its lifeless surroundings caused the Tibetans to refer it as "the Ghost Lake". Visitors who approach the lake must be respectful to avoid inauspicious mishaps.

Geography
Though absent of nearby grasslands, the white cobbles, the hills and the island colored with dark red, and the deep blue lake water present another distinctive picture absent from many of the places more frequented by visitors. In 2004, Lake Manasarovar and Rakshastal were designated as a single Ramsar Wetland complex, under the name 'Mapangyong Cuo'.

Access 
Lake Rakshartal lies right next to Lake Manasarovar, and is an integral part of the Kailash-Manasarovar pilgrimage. For knowing how to reach Lake Rakshastal, see the 'Access' section on the Mount Kailash page.

Climate

See also
 Lake Manasarovar
 Mount Kailash
 Lakes of India

References 

Lakes of Tibet
Hindu pilgrimage sites in China
Indus basin